Leann Hunley (born February 25, 1955) is an American television actress. Although she has worked in numerous productions, she is perhaps best known for portraying Anna DiMera on NBC's Days of Our Lives and Dana Waring on the ABC primetime soap opera, Dynasty.

Early life
Hunley was born in Forks, Washington, and attended the University of Washington. Her father was a commercial fisherman and her mother a beautician. She is the youngest of four siblings. Her previous occupation is an answering service operator. Leann has worked as a model and won second runner up in the Miss Hawaii pageant in 1977.

Career
Hunley's first television appearance was on Hawaii Five-O, in which she played separate characters in two different episodes during the series' 10th season from 1977 to 1978. After appearing as an unnamed female Colonial Warrior in four episodes of Battlestar Galactica, Hunley guest-starred on Mrs. Columbo and B.J. and the Bear before becoming a regular on the latter series' spinoff The Misadventures of Sheriff Lobo from 1979 and 1980. Her role as Anna DiMera on Days of Our Lives from 1982 to 1986 won her an Emmy Award at the 13th Daytime Emmy Awards for best supporting actress in 1986. For three seasons of Dynasty, Hunley portrayed Dana Waring, Adam Carrington's wife. She appeared on Aaron Spelling's short-lived Models, Inc.. In the first season of Dawson's Creek (1998) she was Tamara Jacobs, a high school English teacher who has a tempestuous affair with her student Pacey Witter. She also played Shira Huntzberger on Gilmore Girls in 2005, and has guest-starred in various comedy and drama series such as Just Shoot Me!, Strong Medicine, Raising Hope, NCIS, and Law & Order: Special Victims Unit.

After a 21-year absence from playing the role, Hunley returned to Days of Our Lives  as Anna on June 21, 2007, recurring on the series until mid-2010. She again returned to play the role of Anna DiMera for a story arc beginning in January 2017, and has continued to make appearances on the NBC daytime serial as of September 2022, while also playing the same character in the spinoff series Days of Our Lives: Beyond Salem airing on the Peacock streaming service since 2021.

Filmography

Awards and nominations

References

External links 
 
 
 
 

Living people
American film actresses
American television actresses
American soap opera actresses
People from Clallam County, Washington
Daytime Emmy Award winners
Daytime Emmy Award for Outstanding Supporting Actress in a Drama Series winners
Female models from Washington (state)
University of Washington alumni
20th-century American actresses
21st-century American actresses
1955 births